EMS Healthcare is a supplier of mobile medical equipment based in Ellesmere Port.

It supplied Vision Express with a mobile Vision Van in 2015 working with the Road Haulage Association to offer free eye tests to both public and professional drivers.

It also has a mobile decontamination unit for use with gastrointestinal endoscopy equipment.

It started a contract with Manchester Royal Eye Hospital in 2015 to provide a mobile medical unit for up to 40 patients a day with wet age-related macular degeneration operating at Trafford General Hospital.

 Mid and South Essex NHS Foundation Trust set up an ambulance handover unit supplied by the company in October 2022. It will accommodate 12 patients and cost £235,000.

References

Private providers of NHS services
Companies based in Cheshire